Scandinavian Airlines System Flight 901, was a scheduled international flight operated by the Scandinavian Airlines System, that overran the runway at its destination at John F. Kennedy International Airport on February 28, 1984. The flight, using a McDonnell Douglas DC-10, originated at Stockholm Arlanda Airport, Sweden, before a stopover at Oslo Airport, Gardermoen, Norway. All 177 passengers and crew members on board survived, although 12 were injured. The runway overshoot was due to the crew's failure to monitor their airspeed and overreliance on the aircraft's autothrottle.

Aircraft

Flight 901 was a McDonnell Douglas DC-10-30, registered as LN-RKB, named the Haakon Viking, and first flown in testing in 1975. Its McDonnell Douglas construction number was 46871/219. The aircraft was equipped with three General Electric CF6-50C engines. It entered into commercial flight service with Scandinavian Airlines in January 1976.

Investigation
The National Transportation Safety Board (NTSB) investigated the accident. Investigators first thought a probable cause of the crash could be hydroplaning since there was bad weather on arrival, but this was later ruled out when investigators inspected the runway and found that the grooves on the runway were in good condition and there were no recent reports of hydroplaning on that runway. The NTSB discovered from eyewitnesses that the airport's control tower could not see the flight arriving due to low visibility. However, they and passengers on the flight reported that the aircraft traveled an unusually long distance before landing. According to the flight's cockpit voice and flight data recorders, the aircraft was at an unusually high speed of 205 knots before landing. It was also noticed that the captain only monitored his airspeed, not the shown ground speed. To avoid striking the approach lighting system, they veered the DC-10 off Runway 04R using the aircraft's rudder. The aircraft came to a rest in shallow water  from Runway 04R.

Investigators discovered that the captain was relying on the aircraft's autothrottle, believing that it would automatically decrease turbine power. NTSB investigators also found that the autothrottle control system had malfunctioned during previous flights. They believe that during the approach, the DC-10's autothrottle had a software malfunction, leading to increased airspeed before touching down. In the NTSB's final report, the probable cause of SAS Flight 901 states that "The flightcrew’s (a) disregard for prescribed procedures for monitoring and controlling of airspeed during the final stages of the approach and (b) decision to continue the landing rather than to execute a missed approach, and (c) overreliance on the autothrottle speed control system which had a history of recent malfunctions".

Aftermath
The NTSB had issued two safety recommendations to the Federal Aviation Administration on November 16, 1984, one day after releasing the final report.

After the accident, mechanics found that LN-RKB suffered substantial damage, but was later repaired and returned to service, until it was bought by Federal Express in 1985, reregistered as N311FE, and converted into a freighter. It was withdrawn from use and stored in 2012; in 2013 it was returned to service. The aircraft would operate for FedEx Express, before being retired on December 31st, 2022.

References

External links
NTSB Final Report, November 15, 1984
FAA Accident Report Index
 Some Inadequacies of the current human factors certification process of advanced aircraft technologies, NASA and BEA archived report

February 1984 events in the United States
Airliner accidents and incidents caused by pilot error
Airliner accidents and incidents involving runway overruns
Accidents and incidents involving the McDonnell Douglas DC-10
1984 in New York City